The General Affairs Council is a configuration of the Council of the European Union and meets once a month. Meetings bring together the Foreign Ministers of the Member States. Ministers responsible for European Affairs also participate depending on the items on agenda. Ministers of several other domains can be present as well, it can be cross-ministries as well. 

It was created in 2009 by the Treaty of Lisbon by splitting it from the "General Affairs and External Relations Council" with the other part becoming the Foreign Affairs Council. The General and Foreign Councils are the only two Councils mentioned in the EU treaties.

The General Affairs Council deals with dossiers that affect more than one of the EU's policies, such as negotiations on EU enlargement, preparation of the EU's multi-annual budgetary perspective or institutional and administrative issues. It co-ordinates preparation for and follow-up to meetings of the European Council. It also exercises a role in co-ordinating work on different policy areas carried out by the Councils other configurations, and handles any dossier entrusted to it by the European Council.

Composition

Configurations

External links
 About the General Affairs Council
 Press releases of the General Affairs Council
 The General Affairs Council: The Key to Political Influence of Rotating Presidencies by Piotr Maciej Kaczyński, Andrew Byrne

Council of the European Union